Alison Parker may refer to:

Alison Parker (Melrose Place), character in the television series Melrose Place
a Money Heist character
 Alison Parker (reporter) (1991–2015), American television news reporter murdered in 2015 during a live interview